Lansing is a city in Leavenworth County, Kansas, United States.  It is situated along the west side of the Missouri River and Kansas-Missouri state border.  As of the 2020 census, the population of the city was 11,239.  It is the second most populous city of Leavenworth County and is a part of the Kansas City metropolitan area.  The Lansing Correctional Facility (formerly the Kansas State Penitentiary), which includes the state's main maximum-security prison, is located in Lansing.

History

Lansing is named for James Lansing, a pioneer settler. Formerly William Lansing Taylor, James changed his name upon his enlistment in 1862 as a hospital steward in the 7th Kansas Cavalry. Following the Civil War, he earned a position at the new state penitentiary in Kansas as a hospital steward. Lansing did not become an incorporated city until 1959.

The Kansas State Penitentiary, later renamed the Lansing Correctional Facility in 1990, was authorized by the Kansas Constitution in 1859; it is the state's largest and oldest facility for detention and rehabilitation of male adult felons.  With the opening of the coal mine at the prison the town became an important shipping point for this product.

Lansing was ranked 88 in the top 100 of Money Magazine's 2007 list of best places to live.

Geography
Lansing is located at  (39.248689, -94.891880).  The city is situated along the western bank of the Missouri River which also marks the Kansas-Missouri state border.  It is bordered by the city of Leavenworth to the north; Kansas City is less than a half-hour to the southeast.  U.S. Route 73 passes through the city.

Climate
The climate in this area is characterized by hot, humid summers and generally mild to cool winters.  According to the Köppen Climate Classification system, Lansing has a humid subtropical climate, abbreviated "Cfa" on climate maps.

Demographics

2010 census
As of the census of 2010, there were 11,265 people, 3,180 households, and 2,496 families living in the city. The racial makeup of the city was 80.2% White, 13.2% African American, 0.8% Native American, 2.0% Asian, 0.1% Pacific Islander, 0.8% from other races, and 2.8% from two or more races. Hispanic or Latino of any race were 5.1% of the population.

There were 3,180 households, of which 41.9% had children under the age of 18 living with them, 62.4% were married couples living together, 11.8% had a female householder with no husband present, 4.3% had a male householder with no wife present, and 21.5% were non-families. 18.1% of all households were made up of individuals, and 6.7% had someone living alone who was 65 years of age or older. The average household size was 2.79 and the average family size was 3.15.

The median age in the city was 37.6 years. 22.9% of residents were under the age of 18; 8.1% were between the ages of 18 and 24; 31.2% were from 25 to 44; 29.3% were from 45 to 64; and 8.3% were 65 years of age or older. The gender makeup of the city was 59.4% male and 40.6% female.

2000 census
As of the U.S. Census in 2000, there were 9,199 people, 2,435 households, and 1,913 families living in the city. The racial makeup of the city was 81.0% White, 12.5% Black or African American, 1.2% Native American, 1.3% Asian, 0.2% Pacific Islander, 1.3% from other races, and 2.6% from two or more races. Hispanic or Latino of any race were 3.9% of the population.

There were 2,435 households, out of which 42.2% had children under the age of 18 living with them, 65.0% were married couples living together, 9.4% had a female householder with no husband present, and 21.4% were non-families. 18.4% of all households were made up of individuals, and 7.1% had someone living alone who was 65 years of age or older. The average household size was 2.79 and the average family size was 3.17.

In the city, the population was spread out, with 22.0% under the age of 18, 8.8% from 18 to 24, 38.5% from 25 to 44, 23.1% from 45 to 64, and 7.5% who were 65 years of age or older. The median age was 36 years. For every 100 females, there were 164.8 males. For every 100 females age 18 and over, there were 184.9 males.

The median income for a household in the city was $60,994, and the median income for a family was $65,639. Males had a median income of $36,326 versus $28,315 for females. The per capita income for the city was $21,655. About 1.9% of families and 2.4% of the population were below the poverty line, including 1.5% of those under age 18 and 3.5% of those age 65 or over.

Education
The community is served by Lansing USD 469 public school district, and operates four schools with more than 2,000 students.
 Lansing Elementary School, grades K–3
Lansing Intermediate School, grades 4–5
 Lansing Middle School, grades 6–8
 Lansing High School, grades 9–12

Notable people

John Bradford, member of Kansas House of Representatives.
Paul Ranous Greever, United States Representative from Wyoming born in Lansing.

See also
 Lansing Man

References

Further reading

External links

 City of Lansing
 Lansing - Directory of Public Officials
 
 Lansing city map, KDOT

Cities in Kansas
Cities in Leavenworth County, Kansas
Cities in Kansas City metropolitan area
Kansas populated places on the Missouri River
1959 establishments in Kansas
Populated places established in 1959